Mark Goodwin (born 23 February 1960) is an English former professional footballer who played as a midfielder.

Career
He was a professional midfielder with Leicester City, Notts County and Walsall.

He was given his Foxes début as a 17-year-old by Frank McLintock in a 1–0 defeat at Ipswich Town on 17 December 1977. Goodwin scored his first goal for Leicester City on 27 December 1977, away at Old Trafford in a 3–1 defeat to Manchester United He became a regular when Jock Wallace was the Leicester manager often playing at full-back. During the 1979-1980 season he was part of Leicester City side that won the Second Division title. He left Leicester City to join Notts County £60,000 from towards the climax of the 1980-1981 as County were promoted to the First Division. He made 237 appearances for the Magpies scoring 23 goals.
In 1988 he was promoted with a third club, as Walsall defeated Bristol City 4–0 at Fellows Park to earn promotion to the second tier, with Goodwin's corner being headed home by Phil Hawker to make it 3–0. He was released by Walsall in 1990. He then joined Kettering Town in the Football Conference.

He joined Eastwood Town where he was appointed temporary manager in November 1991.
His next club was Arnold Town where he was a player-coach. He made his début on 29 February 1992 in a 1-0 Central Midland League defeat at Lincoln United. His first goal followed on 21 March 1992 in a 3–2 defeat at Harworth Colliery Institute.
He left Arnold to join Hucknall Town during the 1994-1995 close season.

References

1960 births
Living people
English footballers
Notts County F.C. players
Leicester City F.C. players
Walsall F.C. players
Kettering Town F.C. players
Eastwood Town F.C. players
Arnold Town F.C. players
Hucknall Town F.C. players
Footballers from Sheffield
English Football League players
Association football midfielders
Association football defenders
National League (English football) players
Northern Counties East Football League players